José Carrillo Mancilla (born 4 March 1995), simply known as José Carrillo, is a Spanish professional footballer who plays as a centre-back for League of Ireland Premier Division club Finn Harps.

Club career
José Carrillo made his debut in Slovakia on 29 July 2017, against Nitra, in a goal-less tie. In the second half, he was replaced by Martin Koscelník.

On 5th January 2022, Carrillo was unveiled as a new signing at League of Ireland Premier Division club Finn Harps for the 2022 season.

References

External links
 
 Futbalnet profile 
 

1995 births
Living people
Footballers from Granada
Spanish footballers
Spanish expatriate footballers
Association football defenders
Slovak Super Liga players
MFK Zemplín Michalovce players
FK Senica players
Segunda División B players
Zamora CF footballers
UD Logroñés players
Spanish expatriate sportspeople in Slovakia
Expatriate footballers in Slovakia
Finn Harps F.C. players
League of Ireland players
Expatriate association footballers in the Republic of Ireland